Thomas Trail Fenton (born 8 April 1930) is a former television correspondent who retired in 2004 after a 34-year career with CBS News.

Fenton graduated from Dartmouth College in 1952 with a B.A. in English and was an officer in the United States Navy from 1952 to 1961, serving on destroyers in the Atlantic and Mediterranean. His Navy service placed him in Guantanamo Bay, Cuba in 1952, and in the Mediterranean Sea during the 1958 Lebanon Crisis.

Career in journalism
After leaving the Navy, Fenton began his career in journalism as a domestic and foreign correspondent for the Baltimore Sun, where he worked from 1961 to 1969. While with the Sun, he reported on affairs in the Middle East and Europe, including the 1967 Six-Day War and the 1968 "Days of May" in Paris. His 1968 reporting earned Fenton an award from the Overseas Press Club.

Fenton joined CBS News as a Rome-based correspondent in 1970, and conducted the first interview with hostages taken that year by the Palestine Liberation Organization. He later reported on the Indo-Pakistani War of 1971, the 1973 Yom Kippur War, and the 1974 Turkish invasion of Cyprus. When Ayatollah Khomeini overthrew the Shah of Iran in 1979, Fenton was the first western journalist to interview Iran's new leader. He later returned to Tehran to report on the Iran hostage crisis.

In 1991, Fenton was in Israel during the first Gulf War to report on the effects of Scud missile attacks from Iraq. Later that year, he was in Moscow to cover the fall of the Soviet Union. During the 1990s, Fenton reported on the wars in the Balkans, and violence in the Middle East and Africa.

During his CBS career, Fenton served as the network's Bureau Chief in Rome, Italy, (1970-1973), Tel Aviv, Israel, (1973-1977), Paris, France, (1977-1979), London, United Kingdom, (1979-1994), Moscow, Russia, (1994-1996), and London again (1996-2004).

After retiring, Fenton wrote the book, Bad News: The Decline of Reporting, the Business of News, and the Danger to Us All, published in 2005.

External links
 "CBS News' Thomas Fenton Retires" from CBS News
 Mad as Hell from the Urbanite Magazine
 Video interview for The Real News

1930 births
American male journalists
American newspaper reporters and correspondents
American television reporters and correspondents
American war correspondents
Dartmouth College alumni
Living people
People from Baltimore
United States Navy officers